Rapala is a manufacturer of fishing lures and other fishing related products. It was founded in Finland in 1936 by Lauri Rapala, who is credited for creating the world's first floating minnow lure carved from cork with a shoemaker's knife, covered with chocolate candy bar wrappers and melted photography film negatives for a protective outer coating. He created the lure in order to try and catch a pike. The floating minnow lure later went on to become the first Rapala lure once the company was created.

The company produces a similar lure today, with construction of the lure remaining "not much different" from how they were originally built although the core is made from balsa wood instead of cork and covered with paint and lacquer. The original floating minnow, now called the No. 9 floater, is the company's most popular lure.

Rapala's lures are considered some of the world's leading baits and sold in 140 countries with Field & Stream ranking Rapala's Original Floating Minnow the 3rd of the "best topwater lures ever created" in 2019.

Rapala's American subsidiary, Rapala USA, is based in Minnetonka, Minnesota. Design and development teams in the US and Finland work together to develop new lures or modify existing ones for changes in fishing tackle. The company still follows Lauri Rapala's practice of hand-testing each lure produced to make sure it performs as intended. Their products are sold consumer-direct via eCommerce as well as through retailers including Bass Pro Shops and Cabela's in the United States.

Rapala owns a 49 percent stake in 13 Fishing, has exclusive rights to the Okuma fishing brand in Europe and Russia and sponsors a number of professional fishermen. Rapala CEO and President Nicolas Cederström Warchalowski believes Okuma acquisition will embark the group on a growth journey and he is also open for new acquisitions after the pan-European Okuma launch in 2022.

For the period of July–December 2020, the company's operating profit increased to €17.3 million, compared to the previous year's 5.8 million Euro, which it attributes to the COVID-19 pandemic.

Product lines 
Products made by Rapala include fishing lures, crankbaits, jigging lures, lipless crankbaits, surface poppers, filet knives, fishing rods, reels, braided fishing line, fishing and hunting knives, apparel and other fishing related products.

Brands of the Rapala VMC group include amongst others knife manufacturer Marttiini, lure brands Blue Fox and Storm, fishing line manufacturer Sufix and ski brand Peltonen.

Company history

1930–1950s: A family business 
Rapala was founded in 1936 by Lauri Rapala. After having observed the habits of pike, Rapala noted that the fish would often target the slower and off-balanced prey fish. This observation led to the creation of the first Rapala lure, The Original. The lure was characterized by its slightly off-centred wobbling action, that imitated the movements of a wounded fish. Starting out as family business, Rapala was first catering to the needs of the local fishermen, with the family having to allocate time also to farming and fishing. Nevertheless, the word about the lures started getting around, and in 1938 a local co-operative store in Kalkkinen started selling Rapala lures, marking the first commercial breakthrough for the company. After the Winter War, and the Continuation War that followed, more time and effort was dedicated to the growing business. A shed was repurposed as a workshop, and Lauri's sons Risto and Ensio started helping with the manufacturing of the lures. The lures were now properly boxed, and a spinning wheel was fitted with sandpaper in order to bring mechanization into the process. In the 1950s, the lures were gaining in fame – to such an extent that the Rapala family decided to resign from commercial fishing and farm work in order to fully focus on the blossoming business.

1950–1960: International growth 
In 1955, the first Rapala lures were exported to Sweden, with Norway following in 1956. In what turned out to be a decisive turn for the company, some of Rapala's lures made their way to the United States through the American embassy located in Helsinki, as well as the community of Finnish immigrants in America. These lures caught the attention of Ron Weber, owner of a fishing tackle sales company R. W. Weber Sales. Interested in distributing the lures, Weber and his business partner Raymond Ostrom contacted the Rapala family through the Finnish Trade Council in Chicago, and a business partnership was established – one that continues even today. Initially called The Rapala Company, Weber and Ostrom's company eventually changed its name to Normark. Business picked up rapidly, but the real turn was when an article about Rapala was published in Life magazine. Coincidentally, the article appeared in the issue that covered the death of Marilyn Monroe – the issue that went on to become the highest selling in the history of the magazine. The immense media exposure spiked the demand, leading the company to build their first factory in Vääksy, Finland in 1962. A second factory, situated in Riihilahti, followed in 1963.

1970–2000: Changes and diversification 
In 1974, after the passing of Lauri Rapala, the company was passed on to his sons Risto, Esko and Ensio, who had all been involved in the company's business for a long time. It was during this time that Rapala was reformed into a limited company, Rapala Oy. In 1982, the company released the lure Shad Rap, which led to an immense rise in demand. The Shad Rap still remains one of the company's best-selling lures. In the beginning of the 1990s, Rapala acquired the distribution company Normark Scandinavia, marking a major expansion for the company. In 1995, the Rapala family sold Rapala's stocks to a new company founded by six members of the Rapala family, the management of the Rapala company, Bankers Trust and its subsidiaries and funds managed by CVC Capital Partners Europe. In 1999, Rapala acquired Storm Manufacturing Company, the plastic-lure manufacturer. This was the company's first major acquisition since the purchase of the Normark companies in the early 1990s. In 2000, the company successfully expanded into different fishing accessory products, including pliers, forceps, clippers, scales, hook removers and hook sharpeners. In November 2000, Rapala was approached by the French hook manufacturer VMC. The negotiation ended in Rapala purchasing VMC. As a result, the company's name shifted from Rapala Normark Corporation to Rapala VMC Corporation, the name by which it is known today.

Present day and future 
2005 marked a start for an era of strong growth for Rapala, with the company acquiring and establishing distribution companies in South Africa, Australia, Malaysia, China, Thailand and Switzerland. Furthermore, the company acquired the lure manufacturer Luhr Jensen in the USA, knife manufacturer Marttiini in Finland, fishing line supplier Tortue in France and cross-country ski manufacturer Peltonen in Finland. Thereafter, Rapala has established a lure factory and several distribution centers in Russia, a distribution company in Korea and acquired the Terminator spinner bait business in the USA. In 2016, Jorma Kasslin, who had acted as the CEO for the company since 1998, left the position and took position as the president chairman. Kasslin's position was filled by Jussi Ristimäki, the previous executive vice president of the company. In 2020, Nicolas Cederström Warchalowski was appointed as the new President and CEO of Rapala VMC. The company's latest acquisition took place in 2021 when Rapala purchased rights to the Okuma brand in Europe and Russia.

Sustainability 
In 2020, Rapala VMC Corporation launched its new sustainability strategy, with the aim of being one of the world's leading fishing tackle companies in terms of sustainability by 2024. By 2023, the company aims to introduce 100% lead-free wobblers, to further reduce the amount of plastic used in lure packaging, to release new plastic-free packaging for multiple product categories and brands, and to shift to renewable energy in all of its lure production units. Rapala has taken the carbon footprint of their lure production as one of their key performance indicators that is assessed on a regular basis. Even before aligning the sustainability strategy, the company has been active in identifying and minimizing its negative impact on the environment. The company's sustainability actions have included minimizing waste resulting from production processes, using sustainable raw materials, and minimizing air transportation. The company's lure manufacturing units in Finland and Estonia shifted to renewable energy in 2020, with Marttiini's factories following in 2021. In 2021, Sufix, a line-manufacturing brand under Rapala, launched the Sufix Recycline Monofilament fishing line, the first fishing line to be made of 100% recycled materials.

Popular lures 

Some top-running lures (3 feet or shallower) that they make include 
Skitter Pop 
Skitter Prop 
Skitter Walk
Jigging Shad Rap 
Jigging Rap

Some Medium diving (about 3–10 feet) lures may include 
Original Floater
Twitchin' Rap

 Long Cast Minnow

 Scatter Rap Minnow

Scatter Rap Countdown

Some Deep diving Lures (10 feet or deeper) may include 
Magnum
Down Deep Husky Jerk
Scatter Rap Crank Deep
Scatter Rap Crank

Acquisitions

Product recalls 
In January 2021, Rapala recalled 128,000 battery-operated fillet knives manufactured between 2011 and 2018 due to 12 reports of fires caused by charging their batteries with chargers not manufactured by Rapala.

References

Literature 
 Mitchell, J. E.: Rapala: Legendary Fishing Lures. Voyageur Press, 2005.

External links
 
 

Fishing equipment
Finnish brands
Companies listed on Nasdaq Helsinki
Manufacturing companies based in Helsinki
Manufacturing companies established in 1936
Fishing equipment manufacturers
Sporting goods brands
1936 establishments in Finland